Bogorodica Trojeručica (Serbian Cyrillic: Богородица Тројеручица, Greek: Παναγία Τριχερούσα, Panagia Tricherousa, meaning "Three-handed Theotokos") or simply Trojeručica (Тројеручица, Three-handed) is a famous wonderworking icon in the Serbian Orthodox monastery of Hilandar on Mount Athos, Greece. It depicts Theotokos (Virgin Mary) with young Jesus in the hodegetria position, and is covered with a riza. It is the most important icon of the Serbian Orthodox Church. On the back of the icon is the painting of St Nicholas.

History

According to tradition, the icon was in the possession of John of Damascus in the early 8th century and it is associated with his miraculous healing around the year 717. According to tradition, while he was serving as Vizier to caliph Al-Walid I, he was falsely accused of treachery and his hand was cut off. 
The accusation was, allegedly, made by Byzantine Iconoclast emperor Leo the Isaurian, who was indeed a great opponent of St John, and friend of Al-Walid I. Upon praying in front of an icon of the Theotokos, allegedly, his hand was miraculously restored. In thanksgiving, he had a silver replica of his hand fashioned and attached it to the icon. After this, the icon became known as "three-handed" (Tricherousa), because it had three hands (two of Theotokos plus one more).

John Damascene became a monk at Mar Sabbas monastery outside of Jerusalem and gave the icon to the monastic community there. Later the icon was given as a present to St. Sava when he visited the monastery, together with another icon of Theothokos in the style of Nursing Madonna, and with the crosier of Sabbas the Sanctified, the founder of the monastery. Sava brought the icon to Hilandar monastery where he lived. It remained there until 1347 when it was taken by Dušan of Serbia during his visit to Hilandar and brought with him to Serbia. At the end of the 14th century, the icon was in the possession of the Studenica monastery. In the early 15th century, Trojeručica was back in Hilandar.

Until very recently the icon was formally the abbot of Hilandar, with monks elected to serve as its deputy.

Art historians think the style of the icon is more likely from the 14th century, and that it may be a copy or re-painting of an earlier prototype. Another version brought to Moscow in 1661 became famous, and resulted in many Russian copies.

Gallery

See also

Votive deposit
Tama (votive)

References

External links
 Lecture about Trojeručica

Serbian icons
Mount Athos
Eastern Orthodox icons of the Virgin Mary
History of the Serbian Orthodox Church